Luís Henrique Farinhas Taffner (born 17 March 1998), known as Luís Henrique, is a Brazilian footballer who plays as a forward for Japanese club Kataller Toyama.

Club career
Born in Vila Velha, Espírito Santo, Luís Henrique began his professional career at Botafogo de Futebol e Regatas. He made his debut on 3 July 2015, at the age of 17, starting in a Série B against Sampaio Corrêa at the Estádio Olímpico João Havelange, scoring two goals in the first half of a 5–0 victory which kept his team at the top of the table. Away to title rivals Bahia twenty-two days later, he opened a 1–1 draw.

After finishing the year with four goals in 15 appearances and a subsequent promotion, Luís Henrique featured regularly during the 2016 Campeonato Carioca, but only scored two goals. He made his Série A debut on 22 May of that year, coming on as a late substitute for Neílton in a 1–1 away draw against Sport.

On 3 January 2017, after being rarely used, Luís Henrique rescinded his contract – which was due to expire in May – and signed a two-year contract with Atlético Paranaense.

On 16 May 2019, Henrique joined Finnish club Helsinki IFK. On 15 January 2020 it was confirmed, that Helsinki's cooperation club, Vejle Boldklub from Denmark, had signed Henrique. The Brazilian, however, would stay at Helsinki for the 2020 season on loan. HIFK confirmed on 8 September 2020, that Vejle had recalled Henrique. However, he only played 82 minutes in the league and therefore, he was loaned out once again on 24 January 2021, this time to HJK Helsinki.

On 9 March 2022, Henrique joined Japanese J3 League club Kataller Toyama.

International career
Luís Henrique was part of the Brazil squad at the 2015 FIFA U-17 World Cup in Chile. In the last 16, against New Zealand at the Estadio Sausalito in Viña del Mar, he won an added-time penalty when fouled by James McGarry, and converted it for the only goal of the game.

Honours
Botafogo
Campeonato Brasileiro Série B: 2015

References

External links

1998 births
Living people
People from Vila Velha
Brazilian footballers
Brazilian expatriate footballers
Association football forwards
Campeonato Brasileiro Série A players
Campeonato Brasileiro Série B players
Primeira Liga players
Veikkausliiga players
Club Athletico Paranaense players
C.D. Feirense players
Nacional Atlético Clube (SP) players
Grêmio Foot-Ball Porto Alegrense players
Oeste Futebol Clube players
HIFK Fotboll players
Vejle Boldklub players
Helsingin Jalkapalloklubi players
Kataller Toyama players
Brazil youth international footballers
Brazilian expatriate sportspeople in Portugal
Brazilian expatriate sportspeople in Finland
Brazilian expatriate sportspeople in Denmark
Brazilian expatriate sportspeople in Japan
Expatriate footballers in Portugal
Expatriate footballers in Finland
Expatriate men's footballers in Denmark
Expatriate footballers in Japan
Sportspeople from Espírito Santo